is a Japanese keyboardist and composer, specializing in smooth jazz and New-age music.

Biography

Keiko Matsui was born in Tokyo, Japan. Her mother, Emiko, took her to her first piano lesson in the June following her fifth birthday. Japanese tradition holds that a child who is introduced to lessons at this time will continue in those studies for a long time. The tradition held true for Matsui, who studied piano throughout her school years. Though her early training focused on classical music, in junior high school she developed an interest in jazz and began composing her own music.

She started the band Cosmos, which recorded four albums. She recorded her debut solo album, A Drop of Water (Passport, 1987), with her husband Kazu Matsui. She signed with MCA and released the albums No Borders and Under Northern Lights. In 1992 she signed with White Cat. Sapphire (1995) reached No. 1 on the Billboard magazine Contemporary Jazz chart.

She produced her album The Road (Shanachie, 2011) and recorded it with Richard Bona, Vinnie Colaiuta, Jackiem Joyner, and Kirk Whalum. She worked with Bob James on an album during the same year. Her album Soul Quest (2013) reached No. 6 on the jazz chart.

Sound
Matsui blends Western and Eastern music. She has a very spiritual view of composing music, feeling out each composition as though it were, in her words, "coming to me from another space, another dimension," and "catching notes from the silence and then simply placing them together". Matsui sees music as "the great gifts from the human souls from the past, for the children of the future". She believes that music has a power to bring people together and change their lives. "We are connected by music", Matsui wrote, "as the Ocean connects the continents".

A lover of nature, Matsui often makes reference to plants, animals, the elements, and other natural features and phenomena in her song titles. She shows a special fascination with the moon as a number of her compositions refer to the moon in their titles.

Charity work
Her 1997 mini-CD A Gift of Hope went to support the Y-ME National Breast Cancer Organization, and her music appeared in a Lifetime channel special about breast cancer. She performed at an ice skating event in 1997 to support the Susan G. Komen for the Cure. Proceeds from  A Gift of Life went to the National Marrow Donor Program and the Marrow Foundation to help Asians for Miracle Marrow Matches, which promotes the registration of people of ethnic minorities as marrow donors to improve their chances of finding a matching donor. Royalties from her album Wildflower supported the United Nations World Food Programme. She performed at the United Nations Headquarters building in New York City on December 17, 2003, to benefit the program.

Discography

Solo 
 A Drop of Water (Passport, 1987)
 Under Northern Lights (MCA, 1989)
 No Borders (MCA, 1990)
 Night Waltz (Sin-Drome, 1991)
 Cherry Blossom (White Cat, 1992)
 Doll (White Cat, 1994)
 Sapphire (White Cat, 1995)
 Dream Walk (Countdown, 1996)
 Full Moon and the Shrine (Countdown, 1998)
 Whisper from the Mirror (Countdown, 2000)
 Hidamari no Ki (2000) soundtrack (Planet Joy 2002)
 Deep Blue (Narada, 2001)
 Deep Blue - solo piano version (Planet Joy Records, 2001)
 The Ring (Narada, 2002)
 The Piano (Narada, 2003)
 White Owl (Narada, 2003)
 Wildflower (Narada, 2004)
 Walls of Akendora (Narada, 2005)
 Moyo (Heart & Soul) (Shout! Factory, 2007)
 The Road... (Shanachie, 2011)
 Altair & Vega with Bob James (eOne, 2011)
 Soul Quest (Shanachie, 2013)
 Journey to the Heart (Shanachie, 2016)
 Echo (Shanachie, 2019)

Live albums
 Keiko Matsui Live (Countdown, 1999)
 Live in Tokyo (Sony/Columbia, 2002)

EP Albums
 A Gift of Hope (Unity, 1997)
 A Gift of Life (Narada, 2001)

With Cosmos
 Hyoryu (Toshiba-EMI, 1980)
 Session III (Yamaha R&D Studio, 1981)
 Can Can Can! (Pony Canyon, 1982)
 Bourbonsuite (Pony Canyon, 1982)
 Musitopia (Pony Canyon, 1983)
 Musou Toshi Pony Canyon, 1984)
 Lensman (soundtrack) (Pony Canyon, 1984)
 Session V (Yamaha R&D Studio, 1985)

With Kazu Matsui - as guest
 Tribal Mozart (Countdown, 1997)
 Tribal Shubert (Countdown, 1999)
 Tribal Beethoven (Planet Joy, 2001)

With others
 Just My Tone Mariko Tone (1987) 
 Spread Colors, Akira Asakura
 Dancing on the Water, Bob James (Warner Brothers/WEA, 2000)
 Miles to Miles, Jason Miles (Narada, 2005)

Compilation albums
 Collection (GRP, 1997)
 The Very Best Of Keiko Matsui (Verve, 2004)

Videos
 Bridge over the Stars Full Moon and the Shrine Light Above the Trees (Winstar, 1998)
 The Jazz Channel Presents Keiko Matsui (Image Entertainment, 2001) DVD
 White Owl (Narada, 2003) DVD included with the White Owl CD; concert at Bunkamura Orchard Hall (Tokyo, 2002)
 Walls of Akendora bonus DVD included with the music CD; 9 songs with track 10 a home movie of being on the road (2004)
 Live in Tokyo'' (CD and DVD ) (Shanachie, 2015)

References

External links

 

1961 births
Musicians from Tokyo
Japanese emigrants to the United States
Japanese jazz musicians
Japanese jazz pianists
Japanese pianists
Japanese women pianists
Living people
MCA Records artists
Narada Productions artists
Pony Canyon artists
New-age pianists
Smooth jazz pianists
Japanese women in electronic music
21st-century Japanese pianists
Japan Women's University alumni
Shanachie Records artists
21st-century women pianists